Leonor Bessa-Luís Alves Baldaque is a Portuguese actress and writer who was born in 1977 in Porto and currently lives in Paris. She regularly starred on films directed by veteran Manoel de Oliveira. She is granddaughter of Award-winning writer Agustina Bessa-Luís. Leonor was one of the European Shooting Stars nominated by the European Film Promotion.

In January 2012, Gallimard published her first novel "Vita (La Vie Légère)".
In 2020, Verdier published her second novel "Piero Solitude".

Filmography
2009 The Portuguese Nun - Julie de Hauranne
2007 The Enigma Christopher Columbus - Sílvia (1957–60)
2006 Belle toujours - Jovem Prostituta
2005 A Conquista de Faro (short) - Claudina/Donna Brites
2005 Magic Mirror - Vicenta/Abril
2005 Maquette (short) - Leonor
2004 The Fifth Empire - Choir (voice)
2002 The Uncertainty Principle - Camila
2001 Porto of My Childhood - Ela
2001 Le Temps (short) - voice
2001 I'm Going Home - Sylvia
2000 Supercolla (short) - Sinderella
1998 Anxiety - Fisalina

External links
 
 Profile at the European Shooting Stars

Portuguese film actresses
Living people
1977 births